Katrin "Keti" Shitrit-Peretz (born 22 January 1960) is an Israeli politician currently serving as a member of the Knesset for Likud. She previously held the role from 2019 to 2022.

Biography
Katrin Peretz was born in Casablanca, Morocco, to a Sephardic Jewish family. Her family immigrated to Israel in 1962 when she was an eighteen months old baby, initially living in a ma'abara in Lod. She joined the Betar youth movement, and studied for a BA in political science and an MA in public administration at Bar-Ilan University, also gaining a teacher training certificate at Beit Berl Academic College. She worked in schools in Beit Shemesh and Dimona and established a school for modern dance in Kfar Saba. She also headed the office of Beit Shemesh mayor Daniel Vaknin between 1993 and 2008, before serving as the city's Financial Director from 2008 until 2010, during which she also lectured at Bar-Ilan University and the College of Management Academic Studies.

A long-time Likud activist, Shitrit headed the offices of Likud MKs Gideon Sa'ar and Yisrael Katz, before becoming a strategist for Jerusalem mayor Nir Barkat. She was placed thirty-first on the Likud list for the 2009 Knesset elections, but failed to win a seat as Likud won 27 seats. She was thirty-eighth on the joint Likud Yisrael Beiteinu list for the 2013 elections, but the alliance won only 31 seats. The following year she was forced to give up her place on the list (which would have allowed her to enter the Knesset as a replacement for a resigning MK) as she was working for Katz in the Ministry of Transportation. Between 2016 and 2019 she worked as an advisor to Jerusalem mayor Nir Barkat. Prior to the April 2019 elections she was given the thirtieth place on the Likud list, and was elected to the Knesset as the party won 35 seats. She was subsequently re-elected in the early elections in September the same year, and again in 2020 and 2021. However, she lost her seat in the 2022 elections after being placed thirty-ninth on the Likud list. She returned to the Knesset on 15 February 2023 as a replacement for Miri Regev, who resigned under the Norwegian Law.

She is married to Asher Shitrit, they have three children, and reside in Beit Shemesh. Her son Moshe is deputy mayor of the city.

References

External links

1960 births
Living people
Bar-Ilan University alumni
Beit Berl College alumni
Israeli educators
Academic staff of Bar-Ilan University
Likud politicians
People from Casablanca
People from Lod
21st-century Israeli women politicians
Moroccan emigrants to Israel
Academic staff of the College of Management Academic Studies
Israeli people of Moroccan-Jewish descent
Israeli Sephardi Jews
Israeli Mizrahi Jews
Jewish Israeli politicians
Members of the 21st Knesset (2019)
Members of the 22nd Knesset (2019–2020)
Members of the 23rd Knesset (2020–2021)
Members of the 24th Knesset (2021–2022)
Members of the 25th Knesset (2022–)